The 2018 Big East Conference women's soccer tournament was the postseason women's soccer tournament for the Big East Conference held from October 28 through November 4, 2018. The five-match tournament took place at campus sites, with the higher seed hosting each game. The six-team single-elimination tournament consisted of three rounds based on seeding from regular season conference play. The defending champions were the Georgetown Hoyas.  They were the top seed based on an 8–0–1 season in conference play.  The Hoyas were able to defend their crown, beating Butler in the final.  This marks the third year in a row Georgetown has won the tournament.

Bracket

Schedule

Quarterfinals

Semifinals

Final

Statistics

Goalscorers 
2 Goals
 Amber Birchwell – Providence
 Caitlin Farrell – Georgetown
 Halle Stelbasky – Butler

1 Goal
 Amanda Carolan – Georgetown
 Samantha Dewey – Xavier
 Avery Hay – DePaul
 Andi Kennard – Xavier
 Camille Murphy – Providence
 Carson Nizialek – Georgetown
 Annika Schmidt – Butler

All-Tournament team

Source:

References 

 
Big East Conference Women's Soccer Tournament